tert-Butyl nitrite is an organic compound with the formula (CH3)3CONO.  A colorless liquid, it is the tert-butyl ester of nitrous acid.  It is typically employed as a solution with tert-butyl alcohol.

Use
The compound is used as a reagent in organic synthesis. It reacts with secondary amides to give N-nitroso amides:
RC(O)N(H)R  +  (CH3)3CONO  →  RC(O)N(NO)R  +  (CH3)3COH

See also
Butyl nitrite

References

Alkyl nitrites